Eliseo Martín Omenat (born 5 November 1973 in Monzón) is an Aragonese Spanish long-distance runner who specializes in 3000 metres steeplechase. His biggest success was the bronze medal at the 2003 World Championships in Paris.

Competition record

Personal bests
1500 metres - 3:40.96 min (2000)
3000 metres - 7:50.71 min (2003)
5000 metres - 13:47.77 min (2001)
10,000 metres - 28:39.11 min (1999)
3000 metres steeplechase - 8:09.09 min (2003)

External links

1973 births
Living people
Spanish male long-distance runners
Spanish male middle-distance runners
Athletes (track and field) at the 2000 Summer Olympics
Athletes (track and field) at the 2004 Summer Olympics
Athletes (track and field) at the 2008 Summer Olympics
Olympic athletes of Spain
World Athletics Championships medalists
Spanish male steeplechase runners
Athletes (track and field) at the 1997 Mediterranean Games
Mediterranean Games competitors for Spain